The 1946 Delaware State Hornets football team represented the State College for Colored Students—now known as Delaware State University—as a member of Colored Intercollegiate Athletic Association (CIAA) in the 1946 college football season. The Hornets compiled a 5–4 record under coach Tom Conrad. The Hornets were invited to three bowls after the season: the Cattle Bowl in Fort Worth, Texas, the Palmetto Bowl in Columbia, South Carolina, and the Flower Bowl in Jacksonville, Florida. They turned down offers from Texas and South Carolina to play against Florida N&I in the Flower Bowl. They won the game 7–6 after blocking a conversion attempt at the end of the game. It is currently the only Delaware State bowl game win in history.

Schedule

Notes

References

Delaware State
Delaware State Hornets football seasons
Delaware State Hornets football